Machne Israel is the social service organization of the Chabad-Lubavitch movement.

Founding
Machneh Israel was founded by the Lubavitch leader Rabbi Yosef Yitzchok Schneersohn in May 1941, he remained at the head of the organisation until his death in 1950 and appointed his son in-law Rabbi Menachem Mendel Schneersohn as the executive director. rabbi Yehuda krinsky serves as chairman. The Machne Israel Development Fund was later founded in 1984 in order to help fund and expand Chabad institutions.

Mission
The organisation attempts to encourage Torah observance, performance of Mitzvot and bring people back to Teshuva. Additionally, the organisation's stated goal was to spread the previous Lubavitcher Rebbe's message of "The quicker to Teshuva, the quicker the redemption (Moshiach) will arrive".

Community projects
Mahane Israel has initiated a number of community projects, including:

Mishnayoth Baal Peh – The six parts of the Mishna would be divided among the members with a raffle with the whole Mishna being completed once a year.
Tehillim Societies – Mahane Israel would also create Tehillim societies for the daily saying of psalms as well as enhancing and encouraging the existing ones. These societies work with the Universal Tehillim Society founded in the Old City of Jerusalem.
Chalukat Hashas – The whole Talmud is split amongst the members of Mahane Israel, with each member taking upon himself one tractate to complete by year's end.
Keren Hashana – A yearly fundraiser for the needy taking place during the High Holidays.

References

Chabad organizations
Jewish organizations based in the United States
Yosef Yitzchak Schneersohn
Chabad in the United States
Jewish organizations established in 1941
Orthodox Jewish outreach